Miranha may refer to:
 Miranha (cicada), a genus of cicadas
 Miranha people, or Bora, an ethnic group of the Amazon
 Miranha language, or Bora, their language

See also 
 Mirania (spider), or Perania, a genus of spiders

Language and nationality disambiguation pages